Heidi Kivelä (born 6 November 1988) is a Finnish football midfielder currently playing in the Naistenliiga for PK-35 Vantaa, with whom she has also played in the UEFA Champions League. She made her debut for the Finnish national team against Russia in February 2013 and went to the 2013 Cyprus Cup.

In June 2013 Kivelä was named in national coach Andrée Jeglertz's Finland squad for UEFA Women's Euro 2013.

References

1988 births
Living people
Finnish women's footballers
Finland women's international footballers
PK-35 Vantaa (women) players
Kansallinen Liiga players
Women's association football midfielders